"Life" (known as "Life (Everybody Needs Somebody to Love)" in the US) is a song by Trinidadian-German Eurodance artist Haddaway. Written and produced by Dee Dee Halligan (Tony Hendrik) and Junior Torello, the song was released on 30 July 1993 as the second single from Haddaway's debut album, The Album (1993), and the follow-up to his successful debut single, "What Is Love". The song peaked at number one in Finland, Israel, Spain and Sweden. And within the top 5 in Austria, Denmark, Germany, Iceland, Ireland, Italy, Lithuania, the Netherlands and Switzerland. On the Eurochart Hot 100, "Life" reached the top spot. Another CD maxi were produced at the end of that year containing new remixes (one of them was made by Bass Bumpers). By March 1994, "Life" had sold 1.5 million copies worldwide.

Chart performance
Like its predecessor, "Life" made an huge impact on the charts on several continents. It peaked at number one in Finland, Spain and Sweden as well as on the Eurochart Hot 100, where it hit the top spot in October 1993. In addition, the single reached number two in Austria, Denmark, Germany, Italy and Switzerland. It was a top 5 hit also in Belgium (3), France (5), Iceland (4), Ireland (3), Lithuania, the Netherlands (3) and Norway (3). In the United Kingdom, it peaked at number six on 3 October 1993, after three weeks on the UK Singles Chart. It stayed at that position for two weeks. But on the UK Dance Singles Chart, it was even more successful, reaching number two. Outside Europe, "Life" reached number one in Israel and on the Canadian RPM Dance/Urban chart, number five on the US Billboard Hot Dance Club Play chart, number 14 in Zimbabwe, number 15 on the Canadian RPM Top Singles chart and number 41 on the Billboard Hot 100. 

The song was awarded with a gold record in Austria and Sweden, with a sale of 15,000 and 10,000 singles sold. In Germany, it received a platinum record for 500,000 units sold.

Critical reception
AllMusic editor Jose F. Promis complimented Haddaway's "passionate, urgent delivery" on the song. Larry Flick from Billboard felt that "although there is no denying the stylistic similarity to Haddaway's huge "What Is Love", this single gains its own strength through a fun, sing-along chorus and warmly upbeat lyrics. Added pleasure comes from Haddaway's assured voice." He also wrote that it "does have a chorus that instantly sticks to the brain". Dave Sholin from the Gavin Report noted that the singer "delivers an early Christmas present. "Life..." comes complete with a melody as compelling as his debut smash". A reviewer from Kingston Informer viewed it as "brilliant". In his weekly UK chart commentary, James Masterton said, "The new track aims to repeat this same formula and does so just about." Pan-European magazine Music & Media stated that "variations on a theme have always been bona fide recording tricks and subsequently "Life" will be "What Is Love?" Part II." 

Alan Jones from Music Week gave it four out of five, describing it as "a bouncy, commercial Euro-house track which will have little appeal to club cognoscenti but will delight the mainstream audience." He added, "It won't be as big as "What Is Love?" (few records are) but should safely reach the Top 10." John Kilgo from The Network Forty found that it is "familiar in sound" to his debut single, noting further that "this tune will research phenomenally, following in the heels of its predecessor." Reading Evening Posts reviewer felt it "provides strong evidence to suggest that Haddaway won't be a one-hit wonder", adding that "he sounds like Seal". James Hamilton from the RM Dance Update deemed it a "simple Teutonic pop bounder". Tom Doyle from Smash Hits gave it one out of five, calling it "an uninspired plodder which recycles the synth tune from Snap's "Rhythm Is a Dancer" and ponders the notion that "Life will never be the same/Life is changing"."

Music video
The accompanying music video of "Life" was partly inspired by the German 1927 movie Metropolis by Fritz Lang. Haddaway plays a scientist and inventor, like Rotwang in the movie. He designs a dancing robot, the Maschinenmensch, shaped like a woman. He tries to give life to it and manages to transform it into a real woman. They then dance to the rhythm, with the woman following Haddaway's movements. In the end, he takes off her helmet. She opens her eyes and he kisses her. 

The music video received heavy rotation on MTV Europe, and was later published on Coconut Records' official YouTube channel in August 2012. As of December 2022, the video had generated more than 16 million views.

Track listings
 CD maxi "Life" (Radio Edit) — 4:18
 "Life" (12" Mix) — 6:00
 "Life" (Club Life) — 6:13

 Cassette single "Life" — 4:18
 "Life" (Instrumental) — 4:18

 CD maxi – Remixes'
 "Life / Remix" (Mission Control Mix) — 7:00
 "Life" (Bass Bumpers Remix) — 5:55
 "Life" (Radio Edit) — 4:15

Charts and sales

Weekly charts

1 Remix version

Year-end charts

Certifications

Release history

References

1993 singles
1993 songs
English-language German songs
Eurodance songs
European Hot 100 Singles number-one singles
Haddaway songs
House music songs
Number-one singles in Finland
Number-one singles in Israel
Number-one singles in Spain
Number-one singles in Sweden
Songs written by Tony Hendrik